Thomas Ludlam may refer to:

 Thomas Ludlam (priest) (1727–1811), English priest, theologian and essayist
 Thomas Ludlam (colonial administrator) (1775–1810), nephew of the above and governor of Sierra Leone